Kerrin is both a given name and a surname. Notable people with the name include:

Given name
Kerrin Harrison (born 1964), New Zealand badminton player
Kerrin Hayes (born 1951), Australian rules footballer
Kerrin Lee-Gartner (born 1966), Canadian alpine skier
Kerrin McEvoy (born 1980), Australian jockey
Kerrin Petty (born 1970), American-Swedish cross-country skier
Kerrin Vautier, New Zealand economist

Surname
Jessica Scott Kerrin, Canadian writer
Richard Kerrin (1898–1988), Scottish Anglican dean

See also
Kerrins